This article concerns the period 769 BC – 760 BC.

Events and trends

 763 BC—June 15—A solar eclipse at this date (in month Sivan) is used to fix the chronology of the Ancient Near East. 

 Amaziah, king of Judah, dies and is succeeded by his son Uzziah.

Significant people
 Argishtis I of Urartu (r. 786-764 BC)
 Amaziah of Judah (co-ruled Judah with Uzziah c. 792-768 BC, according to Edwin R. Thiele)
 Archilaus, king of Sparta
 Marduk-apla-usur, king of Babylon (r. c. 780-769 BC)
 Eriba-Marduk, king of Babylon (r. c. 769-761 BC)
 Rivallo (legendary king of the Britons)
 Alara of Nubia, King of Kuch (r. 795-c. 765 BC
 Uzziah, king of Judah (ruled Judah solely until c. 751 BC)

References 

 

es:Años 760 a. C.